Crocallis tusciaria, the smoky scalloped oak, is a species of moth of the family Geometridae. It is found from Morocco through southern Europe and Asia Minor to the Caucasus, northern Iran and Turkmenistan. The eastern range extends to the southern Ural.

The wingspan is 31–40 mm. Adults are on wing from August to October in one generation per year.

The larvae feed on the leaves of various plants, including Prunus spinosa, Clematis vitalba, Crataegus, Frangula alnus and Berberis vulgaris. Larvae can be found from May to June. The species overwinters as an egg.

Subspecies
Crocallis tusciaria tusciaria
Crocallis tusciaria taurica Wehrli, 1934

References

External links

BioLib
Lepiforum.de
schmetterlinge-deutschlands.de

Moths described in 1793
Ennomini
Moths of Europe
Moths of Asia
Taxa named by Moritz Balthasar Borkhausen